Niccolò Cartissani (1670 – 1742) was an Italian painter, mainly of landscape subjects, during the late-Baroque.

Biography
He was born in Messina, but died in Rome. He is described as the best landscape painter after of his day from Sicily after Giulio Avellino.

References

18th-century Italian painters
Italian male painters
Italian Baroque painters
1670 births
1742 deaths
Painters from Messina
18th-century Italian male artists